The equestrian statue of Francisco I. Madero is installed outside the Palacio de Bellas Artes in Mexico City, Mexico.

References

External links

 

Equestrian statues in Mexico
Historic center of Mexico City
Monuments and memorials in Mexico City
Outdoor sculptures in Mexico City
Sculptures of men in Mexico
Statues of presidents of Mexico
Statues of military officers